BoJack Horseman is an American adult animated tragicomedy created by Raphael Bob-Waksberg. Presented as a sitcom set primarily in Los Angeles, the series tells the story of the eponymous anthropomorphic horse (voiced by Will Arnett), who is a washed-up star of a 1990s sitcom who plans his return to celebrity relevance with an autobiography to be written by human ghostwriter Diane Nguyen (Alison Brie). He also has to contend with his cat agent Princess Carolyn (Amy Sedaris), human roommate Todd Chavez (Aaron Paul), and former dog rival Mr. Peanutbutter (Paul F. Tompkins), as well as his struggles with depression and addiction. The series premiered on Netflix on August 22, 2014, and concluded on January 31, 2020, after six seasons and  77 episodes.

Despite mixed reviews upon its debut, critics were significantly more positive towards the second half of the first season, and the subsequent seasons received widespread critical acclaim. GQ hailed the show as one of the best of the decade, and IndieWire ranked BoJack Horseman as the greatest animated TV show of all time. The show has been lauded for its realistic take on depression, trauma, addiction, self-destructive behavior, racism, sexism, sexuality, and the human condition.

Throughout its run, the series has received numerous accolades, including three Saturn Award nominations for Best Animated Series on Television, four Critics' Choice Television Awards for Best Animated Series, and two Creative Arts Emmy Award nominations for Outstanding Animated Program. For her portrayal of the human child actress Sarah Lynn in the episode "That's Too Much, Man!", where the character struggles with addiction and dies from an overdose, Kristen Schaal was nominated for the Primetime Emmy Award for Outstanding Character Voice-Over Performance. Additionally, writers on the show have received a total of seven nominations from the Writers Guild of America, three of which were won by Joe Lawson, Kate Purdy, and Nick Adams.

Awards and nominations

Notes

References

External links
 

Awards
BoJack Horseman